The Kenton Era is a compilation album by pianist and bandleader Stan Kenton featuring recordings from 1940 to 1954 which was originally released in two limited edition box sets, as fifteen 7 inch 45 rpm discs and four 12 inch LPs, on Capitol in 1955.

Critical reception

The Allmusic review by Scott Yanow states "Kenton is heard reminiscing about his first 15 years in the business, there are some selections taken from his famous 1941 stint at the Rendezvous Ballroom in Balboa, CA, numbers from rehearsals in 1944, radio airchecks dating from 1944-48, some startling performances by Kenton's Innovations orchestra of 1950-51 and a few swinging numbers from his 1952-53 big band. Virtually all of the music is rare, making this an essential acquisition for collectors".

Track listing
Part 1: Prologue
 Stan Kenton Speaks of the Development of His Music - 11:48   
Part 2: Balboa Bandwagon
 "Artistry in Rhythm (Opening Theme)" (Stan Kenton) - 0:42
 "Two Moods" (Ralph Yaw) - 2:08   
 "Etude for Saxophones" (Kenton) - 3:15   
 "I Got It Bad (and That Ain't Good)" (Duke Ellington, Paul Francis Webster) - 2:59   
 "Lamento Gitano" (Traditional) - 2:54   
 "Reed Rapture" - 2:14   
 "La Cumparsita" (Gerardo Matos Rodríguez) - 3:16   
 "St. James Infirmary" (Joe Primrose) - 3:16   
 "Arkansas Traveler" (Traditional) - 2:03   
 "Artistry in Rhythm (Closing Theme)" (Kenton) - 0:56  
Part 3: Growing Pains
 "Russian Lullaby" (Irving Berlin) - 2:19   
 "I Lost My Sugar in Salt Lake City" (Johnny Lang, Leon René) - 2:05   
 "Opus a Dollar Three Eighty" (Pete Rugolo) - 2:21   
 "I Know That You Know" (Vincent Youmans, Anne Caldwell) - 1:51   
 "I'm Going Mad for a Pad" (Joe Greene, Stan Kenton, Jack Lawrence) - 3:04   
 "Ol' Man River" (Jerome Kern, Oscar Hammerstein II) - 3:01   
 "I'll Remember April" (Gene de Paul, Patricia Johnston, Don Raye) - 3:03   
 "Liza" (George Gershwin, Ira Gershwin, Gus Kahn) - 2:09
Part 4: Artistry in Rhythm
 "One Twenty" (Yaw) - 2:41
 "Body and Soul" (Johnny Green, Frank Eyton, Edward Heyman, Robert Sour) - 3:14
 "Tea for Two" (Vincent Youmans, Irving Caesar) - 2:49   
 "I Never Thought I'd Sing the Blues" (Floyd Bean, Eddie Stone) - 2:57
 "I've Got the World on a String" (Harold Arlen, Ted Koehler) - 3:37
 "Everybody Swing" (Gene Roland) - 2:13
 "You May Not Love Me" (Jimmy Van Heusen, Johnny Burke) - 2:54
 "More Than You Know" (Vincent Youmans, Edward Eliscu, Billy Rose) - 2:23  
Part 5: Progressive Jazz
 "Artistry in Harlem Swing" (Roland) - 2:45   
 "If I Could Be with You" (James P. Johnson, Henry Creamer) - 3:41
 "By the River St. Marie" (Edgar Leslie, Harry Warren) - 1:36   
 "Sophisticated Lady" (Ellington, Mitchell Parish) - 3:11   
 "Interlude" (Rugolo) - 3:54   
 "Over the Rainbow" (Arlen, Yip Harburg) - 3:19   
 "Machito" (Rugolo) - 2:15   
 "Elegy for Alto" (Kenton, Rugolo) - 4:02 
Part 6: Innovations
 "In Veradero" (Neal Hefti) - 4:15   
 "Amazonia" (Laurindo Almeida) - 4:37   
 "Salute" (Rugolo) - 4:02
 "Coop's Solo" (Shorty Rogers) - 3:39
 "Ennui" (Bill Russo) - 3:37
 "Samana" (Manny Albam) - 3:49
Part 7: Contemporary
 "Swing House" (Gerry Mulligan) - 2:53   
 "You Go to My Head" (J. Fred Coots, Haven Gillespie) - 3:18   
 "Baa-Too-Kee" (Almeida) - 2:40   
 "Stella by Starlight" (Victor Young, Ned Washington) - 3:16   
 "Bill's Blues" (Russo) - 2:51   
 "Modern Opus" (Robert Graettinger) - 3:13   
 "Zoot" (Bill Holman) - 3:16   
Part 8: Epilogue
 Epilogue: Stan Kenton Speaks a Word in Summation and Looks to the Future - 2:10   
 "Artistry in Rhythm (Theme)" (Kenton) - 3:58

Recording locations
Recorded at Music City, Hollywood, CA on November 1, 1940 (track 2-3), at the Rendezvous Ballroom in Balboa, CA on July 25, 1941 (tracks 2-2 & 2-6), August 17, 1941 (tracks 2-4, 2-7 & 2-9) and September 1, 1941 (tracks 2-1, 2-5, 2-8 & 2-10), at the Civic Auditorium in Pasadena, CA on January 14, 1944 (3-2, 3-6 & 3-8), at Band Rehearsal in Hollywood, CA on April 20, 1944 (3-4 & 3-7), at MacGregor Studio, Hollywood, CA on May 20, 1944 (3-5), at Band Rehearsal in Hollywood, CA on December 6, 1944 (3-1 & 3-3), at Radio Recorders, Hollywood, CA on November 27, 1945 (4-2), December 20, 1945 (4-1, 4-3 & 4-4) and July 18, 1946 (4-5 & 4-8), July 19, 1946 (4-6 & 4-7) and April 1, 1947 (5-1 to 5-4) at the Commodore Hotel, NYC, NY on December 13, 1947 (5-6), at the Hollywood Bowl, CA on June 12, 1948 (5-5, 5-7 & 5-8), at the Capitol Studios, Melrose Avenue, Hollywood CA on February 3, 1950 (6-2) and February 5, 1950 (6-1), March 19, 1952 (7-5) and March 20, 1952 (7-4), January 28, 1953 (7-4), January 30, 1953 (7-3) and December 7, 1954 (1-1 & 8-1), at the Cornell Rhythm Club Concert, Ithaca, NY on October 14, 1951 (6-3 to 6-6), at Universal Recorders in Chicago, IL on September 15, 1952 (7-1 & 7-2) and July 9, 1953 (8-2) and at The Alhambra in Paris, France, on September 18, 1953 (7-7).

Personnel

 Bob Ahern - guitar
 Manny Albam - 
 Laurindo Almeida - guitar, rhythm, soloist
 Chico Álvarez - soloist, trumpet
 Nestor Amaral - bongos, rhythm
 John Anderson - trumpet
 Al Anthony - alto saxophone, saxophone, soloist
 Harold Arlen - 
 Bill Atkinson - trombone
 Don Bagley - bass
 Chet Ball - saxophone
 Frank Beach - trumpet
 Floyd Bean - 
 Morey Beeson - saxophone
 Gregory Bemko - cello
 Irving Berlin - 
 Milt Bernhart - soloist, trombone
 Eddie Bert - trombone
 Harry Betts - soloist, trombone
 Ralph Blaze - guitar, tuba
 Zachary Bock - cello
 Ray Borden - trumpet
 Russ Burgher - trumpet
 Irving Caesar - 
 Bart Caldarell - saxophone
 Anne Caldwell - 
 Conte Candoli - soloist, trumpet
 John Carroll - soloist, trumpet
 Buddy Childers - trumpet
 June Christy - vocals
 Dick Cole - trombone
 Ralph Collier - drums
 Bob Cooper - tenor saxophone, saxophone, soloist
 John David Coppola - trumpet
 Earl Cornwell - violin
 Jack Costanzo - bongos, soloist
 Al Costi - guitar
 Phil Davidson - violin
 Don Dennis - trumpet
 Anthony S. Doria - violin
 Red Dorris - tenor saxophone, saxophone, soloist
 Gene Englund - bass, tuba
 Jim Falzone - drums
 George Faye - trombone
 Maynard Ferguson - trumpet
 Tony Ferina - saxophone
 Alluísio Antunes "Lulu" Ferreira - rhythm
 Bob Fitzpatrick - trombone
 Stan Fletcher - tuba
 Harry Forbes - trombone
 Barry Galbraith - guitar
 Karl George - trumpet
 Bob Gioga - saxophone
 John Graas - french horn, horn
 Robert F. Graettinger - arranger, 
 Bart Gray - violin
 Mel Green - trumpet
 Frank Greene - coordination
 María Mendez Grever - 
 Johnny Halliburton - trombone
 Oscar Hammerstein II - 
 Ken Hanna - arranger, trumpet
 E.Y. "Yip" Harburg - 
 Alex Harding - saxophone
 Stanley Harris - viola
 Buddy Hayes - bass
 Bill Holman - saxophone
 James Damian Holmes - violin
 Gene Howard - vocals
 John Howell - trumpet
 Paul Israel - viola
 Gabe Jellen - cello
 Milt Kabak - arranger, trombone
 George Kast - soloist, violin
 Dick Kenney - trombone
 Stan Kenton - bandleader, piano, Primary Artist
 Bob "Dingbod" Kesterson - bass
 Ray Klein - trombone
 Irv Kluger - drums
 Maurice Koukel - violin
 Alex Law - violin
 Skip Layton - soloist, trombone
 Bob Lively - saxophone
 Ivan Lopes - bongos
 Abe Luboff - bass
 Bob Lymperis - trumpet
 Shelly Manne - drums
 Ruban McFall - trumpet
 Dick Meldonian - saxophone
 Seb Mercurio - violin
 Eddie Meyers - alto saxophone, saxophone, soloist
 Dolly Mitchell - vocals
 Dick Morse - trumpet
 Dwight Muma - violin
 Vido Musso - tenor saxophone, saxophone, soloist
 Boots Mussulli - alto saxophone, saxophone, soloist
 Danny Napolitano - violin
 Lennie Niehaus - alto saxophone, saxophone, soloist
 Anita O'Day - soloist, vocals
 Herbert Offner - violin
 José Oliveira - bongos
 Jack Ordean - alto saxophone, saxophone, soloist
 Lloyd Otto - french horn, horn
 Carl Ottobrino - violin
 Don Paladino - trumpet
 Art Pepper - alto saxophone, saxophone, soloist
 Al Porcino - trumpet
 George Price - horn
 Clyde Reisinger - trumpet
 Joe Rizzo - arranger
 George Roberts - soloist, trombone
 Shorty Rogers - trumpet
 Gene Roland - arranger, trumpet
 Ted Romersa - saxophone
 Pete Rugolo - arranger
 Howard Rumsey - bass
 Bill Russo - soloist, trombone
 Eddie Safranski - bass, soloist
 Charlie Scarle - violin
 Dave Schildkraut - saxophone
 Bud Shank - flute, saxophone, soloist
 Aaron Shapiro - viola
 Charlie Shirley - arranger
 Jimmy Simms - trombone
 Zoot Sims & His Five Brothers - tenor saxophone, saxophone, soloist
 Miff Sines - trombone
 Sam Singer - viola
 Clyde Singleton - bass
 Bill Smiley - trombone
 Dave Smiley - viola
 Don Smith - trumpet
 Bart Varsalona - trombone
 Joe Vernon - drums
 Carlos Vidal - Congas
 George Weidler - alto saxophone, saxophone, soloist
 Warner Weidler - saxophone
 Ray Wetzel - soloist, trumpet
 Stu Williamson - trumpet
 Kai Winding - soloist, trombone
 Ben Zimberoff - violin
 Freddie Zito - trombone

References

Stan Kenton albums
1955 albums
Capitol Records albums
Albums arranged by Pete Rugolo
Albums conducted by Stan Kenton